Clifford Bennett (17 March 1884 – 25 August 1957) was an Australian rules footballer who played with Essendon in the Victorian Football League (VFL).

Notes

External links 
		

1884 births
1957 deaths
Australian rules footballers from Melbourne
Essendon Football Club players
Australian military personnel of World War I
People from Yarraville, Victoria
Military personnel from Melbourne